Pedot is the eleventh album of the Finnish rock band CMX. "Pedot" means "Beasts" in Finnish.

The opening track "Eteläisen tähtitaivaan kartoitus" breaks a CMX tradition of starting their albums with powerful rock songs. It is a minimalistic piano-based ballad with no drums. The title track is heavy, progressive and one of the very few tracks where Tuomas Peippo makes use of double bass pedals. "Uusi ihmiskunta" was the first single from the album (the second was "Kain"), and reached #1 on the Finnish singles chart.

Track listing
All songs written by CMX with lyrics by A. W. Yrjänä.

 "Eteläisen tähtitaivaan kartoitus" – 3:36  ("Mapping of the Southern Star Sky") 
 "Pedot" – 4:34  ("Beasts") 
 "Uusi ihmiskunta" – 3:31  ("New Mankind") 
 "Mustat siivet yli taivaan" – 4:22  ("Black Wings across the Sky") 
 "Kain" – 3:55  ("Cain") 
 "Suojelusperkele" – 4:10  ("Guardian Devil") 
 "Taivaanääreläiset" – 4:17  ("People of Heaven's End")   
 "Näkyvän valon olennot" – 2:44  ("Creatures of Visible Light") 
 "Tuulenkosija" – 6:16  ("Courter of the Wind") 
 "Syysmyrkkylilja" – 3:31  ("Autumn Poison Lily") 
 "Sanansaattaja" – 6:17  ("Messenger") 
 "Valoa nopeammat koneet" – 4:11  ("Superluminal Machines")

Personnel

 A. W. Yrjänä - Vocals, Bass Guitar, Acoustic Guitar
 Janne Halmkrona - Guitars, Acoustic Guitar
 Timo Rasio - Guitars, Acoustic Guitar, Mandolin, Lap Steel
 Tuomas Peippo - Drums, Percussions
 Pentti Lahti - Flute
 Mikko Mustonen - Trombone
 Jyrki Sahla - Effects recording
 Kikke Heikkinen, Riitta Talasniemi - Background vocals
 Rake - Producer, Engineer, Mixing
 Rauli Eskolin - Keyboards, Programming
 Pauli Saastamoinen - Mastering
 Perttu Saksa - Photography
 Jussi S. Karjalainen - Sleeve Design
 Gabi Hakanen - Executive Producer

References 

CMX (band) albums
2005 albums